The City of Sunshine was a local government area about  west of Melbourne, the state capital of Victoria, Australia.

History

The local area was first incorporated as the Braybrook Road District on 28 May 1860. The Braybrook Road District became the Shire of Braybrook on 27 May 1871. In May 1916 and again in February 1951, parts of the shire were annexed to the neighbouring Shire of Melton. The Shire of Braybrook was proclaimed a city on 16 May 1951, and was renamed to the City of Sunshine.

Labor Party candidates were successful in most Sunshine Council elections, although Independent candidates were frequently elected. The only endorsed Australian Democrats candidate to be elected in a municipal election, Joe Cilmi, was successful at the City of Sunshine. Cilmi, aged 21, was elected to the Sunshine City Council in August 1982, although he only held office for one three-year term. The city was managed by a state-appointed commissioner, Alex Gillon, from November 1976 until 1982, after the elected council was sacked by the state government for its financial mismanagement.

On 15 December 1994, the City of Sunshine was abolished; the western part of the city, including Sunshine itself, was merged with parts of the City of Keilor, into the newly created City of Brimbank, with the eastern part merging with the City of Footscray, to form the newly created City of Maribyrnong.

Council met at the City Hall, in Alexandra Avenue, Sunshine. The premises is used today as municipal offices for the City of Brimbank.

Ruth Atkins in her book Albany to Zeehan: a new look at local governments dedicated a chapter to the activities of the City of Sunshine during the period 1972–1976.

Wards

On 1 October 1981, the City of Sunshine was subdivided into four wards:
 North Ward
 South Ward
 River Ward

Suburbs
 Albanvale*
 Albion
 Ardeer
 Braybrook
 Brooklyn
 Cairnlea*
 Deer Park
 Derrimut
 Maidstone
 Maribyrnong
 St Albans (shared with the City of Keilor)
 Sunshine+
 Sunshine North
 Sunshine West
 Tottenham

* Suburbs gazetted since the amalgamation.
+ Council seat.

Population

* Estimate in the 1958 Victorian Year Book.

References

External links
 Victorian Places - Sunshine

Sunshine
1869 establishments in Australia
1994 disestablishments in Australia
City of Brimbank
City of Maribyrnong
Sunshine, Victoria